Jaweed Ali (born 15 December 1993) is an Indian cricketer who plays for Hyderabad. He made his List A debut on 14 December 2015 in the 2015–16 Vijay Hazare Trophy. He made his Twenty20 debut on 2 January 2016 in the 2015–16 Syed Mushtaq Ali Trophy. He made his first-class debut on 3 January 2020, for Hyderabad in the 2019–20 Ranji Trophy.

References

External links
 

1993 births
Living people
Indian cricketers
Hyderabad cricketers
Cricketers from Hyderabad, India